The Municipality of Prevalje is a municipality in the traditional region of Carinthia in northern Slovenia. The seat of the municipality is the town of Prevalje. Prevalje became a municipality in 1999.

Settlements
In addition to the municipal seat of Prevalje, the municipality also includes the following settlements:

 Belšak
 Breznica
 Dolga Brda
 Jamnica
 Kot pri Prevaljah
 Leše
 Lokovica
 Poljana
 Šentanel
 Stražišče
 Suhi Vrh
 Zagrad

References

External links

Municipality of Prevalje on Geopedia
Municipality of Prevalje website

Prevalje
1999 establishments in Slovenia